Barbara Randall Kesel (born October 2, 1960) is an American writer and editor of comic books. Her bibliography includes work for Crossgen, Dark Horse Comics, DC Comics, IDW Publishing, Image Comics, and Marvel Comics.

Biography
Barbara Kesel initially entered the comics industry as college student after writing a 10-page letter to editor Dick Giordano regarding the portrayal of female comic book characters and Giordano offered her a writing job. Her first published comics story (credited as "Barbara J. Randall") was "He with Secrets Fears the Sound...", a Batgirl backup feature, in Detective Comics #518 (Sept. 1982). After receiving her college degree in drama studies in 1983, she became an associate editor at DC Comics in 1984 and was promoted to editor the following year. In 1988, she wrote a Batgirl Special and then co-wrote, with her then-husband Karl Kesel, a Hawk and Dove miniseries, followed by an ongoing series that ran from 1989 until 1991. As a solo writer, Barbara Kesel scripted the licensed Dungeons & Dragons series Spelljammer in 1990–1991 and an adaptation of the D&D novel trilogy Avatar in 1991. 

She became an editor at Dark Horse Comics in 1991 and later was part of Team CGW, responsible for most of the design and creation of the setting and characters in the Golden City location. In the second half of the 1990s, she also wrote for Image Comics, scripting all seven issues of Savant Garde, the miniseries Shattered Image with fellow writer Kurt Busiek, and issues of Stormwatch and WildC.A.T.s. For Marvel Comics, Kesel wrote the limited series Ultragirl (1996–1997) and (with Karl Kesel) the Captain America/Citizen V Annual '98. Kesel also returned to DC and wrote the Alpha Centurion Special (1996), several Superboy issues (1997), and the 'Girlfrenzy!'-oneshot Superman: Lois Lane as well as the Elseworld's Finest: Supergirl & Batgirl one-shot in 1998. 

She worked as both a writer and an editor at CrossGen from 2000 to 2004 where she scripted the series Meridian, The First, Sigil and Solus as well as issues of CrossGen Chronicles. In 2007, Tokopop released the first volume of Legends of the Dark Crystal, an OEL manga based on Jim Henson's film The Dark Crystal, written by Kesel. Volume 2 was published in 2010.

As of 2008, she was part of the book packaging company "The Pack" with Lee Nordling, Brian Augustyn, Gordon Kent, and Dave Olbrich. The same year, Barbara Kesel began to work for IDW Publishing, writing a four-part Ghostwhisperer comic miniseries, another miniseries based on the adventure novel series Rogue Angel and the comic adaptation of the animated film Igor. 

In 2015, she wrote a Wonder Woman story for DC's digital series Sensation Comics, later published in print as Sensation Comics #13. When fellow comic book writer Kurt Busiek put together creative teams for the eight standalone, oversized issues of his Marvels Snapshots series, he hired Barbara Kesel to write the first issue starring the 1980s Avengers which was published in 2021.

Currently (in 2022), she's working for tech-startup Urus Entertainment, creating a forthcoming new twist on comics.

Kesel is an outspoken opponent of sexism in the comic book industry. She is known for her strong female characters and created Grace, the ruler of the Golden City location in Comics' Greatest World.

Personal life
She was married to fellow comic book writer Karl Kesel but they have since divorced.

Awards
Kesel has been nominated for the 1991 "Best Editor" Eisner Award for Badlands, Aliens: Genocide and Star Wars. In 1995, she was nominated for "Best Anthology" and "Best Graphic Album of Previously Published Material" Harvey Awards for, respectively, Instant Piano and Hellboy: Seed of Destruction. She won the 1996 "Best Graphic Album of Previously Published Work" Harvey Award, for Hellboy: The Wolves of St. August. Received a Comic-Con International Inkpot Award on July 22nd, 2022 for "Achievement in Comic Arts".

Bibliography

Archaia 

 The Dark Crystal: Creation Myths OGN (among others) (2011)

ComicMix 

 Mine! OGN (among others) (2018)

CrossGen
 CrossGen Chronicles #1, 3, 6 (2000–2002)
 CrossGenesis #1 (2000)
 The First #1–37 (2000–2003)
 Meridian #1–44 (2000–2004)
 Sigil #1–11, 20 (2000–2002)
 Solus #1–8 (2003)

Dark Horse Comics
Aliens vs. Predator: Booty #1 (1996)
Comics' Greatest World: Catalyst: Agents of Change (#8) (1993)
 Comics' Greatest World: Mecha (#6) (1993)
 Comics' Greatest World: Rebel (#5) (1993)
 Comics' Greatest World: Titan (#7) (1993)
Dark Horse Presents vol. 3 #18–20 (2016)
Hard Looks #1 (with Andrew Vachss) (1992)
Real Adventures of Jonny Quest #9–10 (1997)
 Will to Power #7–9 (1994)

DC Comics

 Action Comics #574 (1985)
 Adventures of Superman #557 (1998)
 Alpha Centurion Special #1 (1996)
 Avatar #1–3 (1991)
 Batgirl Special #1 (1988)
Batgirl: The Bronze Age Omnibus #2 (foreword) (2019)
 Batman #401 (1986)
 DC Comics Presents #94 (1986)
 Detective Comics #518–519 (Batgirl backup stories) (1982)
 Elseworld's Finest: Supergirl & Batgirl #1 (1998)
 Elvira's House of Mystery Special #1 (1987)
 The Fury of Firestorm #57 (1987)
 Hawk and Dove vol. 2 #1–5 (1988)
 Hawk and Dove vol. 3 #1–28, Annual #1–2 (1989–1991)
 Hawkman vol. 2 #10 (1987) 
 Heroes Against Hunger #1 (1986)
Invasion! Special: Daily Planet #1 (1989)
 New Talent Showcase #15 (1985)
 The New Titans #68–69 (1990)
 Secret Origins vol. 2 #20 (Batgirl); #43 (Hawk and Dove) (1987–1989)
 Sensation Comics Featuring Wonder Woman #13 (2015)
 Spelljammer #1–8, 11 (1990–1991)
 Superboy vol. 3 #43–44, 48–49, Annual #2 (1995–1998)
 Supergirl Annual #1 (1996)
 Superman: Lois Lane #1 (1998)
 Team Superman Secret Files #1 (1998)
 Teen Titans Spotlight #19 (1988)
 TSR Worlds #1 (1990)
 Who's Who in the DC Universe #1–2, 4, 6–7 (1990–1991) 
 Who's Who in the Legion of Super-Heroes #1–6 (1988)

Amalgam Comics
 Exciting X-Patrol #1 (1997)
 X-Patrol #1 (1996)

Flux 

 Black is for Beginnings OGN (with Laurie Faria Stolarz) (2009)

IDW Publishing 

 Ghost Whisperer: The Muse #1–4 (2008–2009)
 Igor: Movie Adaptation #1–4 (2008)
 My Little Pony: Friends Forever #12, 25 (2014, 2016)
 My Little Pony Micro-Series #4 (2013)
 Rogue Angel: Teller of Tall Tales #1–5 (2008)
 Teenage Mutant Ninja Turtles Micro-Series #7 (2012)
 Womanthology: Heroic OGN (among others) (2011)
 Womanthology: Space #5 (2013)

Image Comics
 Gen¹³ Bootleg #19 (1998)
 Savant Garde #1–7 (1997)
Savant Garde Fan Edition #1–3 (1997)
Shattered Image #1–4 (with Kurt Busiek) (1996)
 Stormwatch #29–30 (1995)
 WildC.A.T.s #35–36 (1997)

Lion Forge Comics 

 Airwolf: Airstrikes #4 (2015)

Marvel Comics
 Captain America/Citizen V '98 #1 (1998) 
 Marvels Snapshots: Avengers #1 (2021) 
 Ultragirl #1–3 (1996–1997)

Silver Dragon Books 

 Animal Planet: The World's Most Dangerous Animals (among others) (2012)

Tokyopop
Aqua volume 1–2 (English adaptation) (2007–2008)
Arcana volume 1–5 (English adaptation) (2005–2007)
Legends of the Dark Crystal volume 1–2 (2007–2010)

Characters created

 Bloody Mary
 Catalyst: Agents of Change 
 Enson
 Grace
 Ilahn of Cadador
 Lindy Karsten
 Malice Vundabar
 
 Sephie of Meridian
 Solusandra
 Speed Queen
 Titan
 Ultra Girl
 Wyture

References

External links
 
 Barbara J. Kesel (Randall) at Mike's Amazing World of Comics

1960 births
American comics writers
American feminist writers
Comic book editors
Female comics writers
Living people
Inkpot Award winners